WWYL (104.1 FM, branded as KISS 104.1) is a radio station serving Binghamton, New York with a top 40 (CHR) format. This station is under the ownership of Townsquare Media.

The station signed on July 1, 1996, as WYOS, an oldies station. It became WWYL in 2002, after changing to a top 40 format as "Wild 104.1"; the WYOS call sign and oldies format moved to 1360 AM. It rebranded as "Kiss 104.1" in 2019.

Previous logos

External links
Kiss 104.1 - Official Website

Radio stations in Binghamton, New York
Contemporary hit radio stations in the United States
Townsquare Media radio stations